The Living Daylights is a run and gun video game adaptation of the 1987 James Bond film The Living Daylights. It was the second Bond game published by Domark following 1985's poorly received A View to a Kill: The Computer Game.

The game was released for all major platforms at the time and developed by De Re Software (Atari 8-bit), Exasoft (BBC Micro), Sculptured Software (Commodore 64) and Walking Circles (Amstrad CPC/PCW, MSX, ZX Spectrum) from a design by Richard Naylor of Domark.

Legacy
The game was re-released as a light gun shooter on various cassette tapes with the ZX Spectrum 007 Action Pack. The plot was greatly rewritten, and explained on narration audiocassettes by Desmond Llewelyn as Q.

See also
Outline of James Bond

References

External links

Movie Game Database - The Living Daylights
MI6 :: James Bond 2007 Video Games - The Living Daylights

1987 video games
Amstrad CPC games
Atari 8-bit family games
BBC Micro and Acorn Electron games
Cancelled Amiga games
Commodore 64 games
James Bond video games
ZX Spectrum games
Computer game
Domark games
Video games based on films
Cold War video games
Video games scored by David Whittaker
Video games developed in Australia